Leon Tigges (born 31 July 1998) is a German footballer who plays as a goalkeeper for SV Rödinghausen.

Personal life
His twin brother Steffen is also a footballer and the pair played together at VfL Osnabrück.

References

External links
 
 Profile on FuPa.net

1998 births
Living people
German footballers
Association football goalkeepers
VfL Osnabrück players
Alemannia Aachen players
SV Rödinghausen players
3. Liga players
Regionalliga players
Oberliga (football) players
Sportspeople from Osnabrück